The three spot cichlid (Cichlasoma trimaculatum), also known as the trimac or red-eyed cichlid, is a species of cichlid from Mexico and Central America, from the subfamily Cichlasomatinae. It is a rarely found as an aquarium fish. Although still included as a highly aberrant member of Cichlasoma by FishBase, other authorities such as Catalog of Fishes have moved it to the genus Amphilophus.

Appearance 
The three spot cichlid is a large heavy bodied cichlid. It has a green or yellow hue base with the distinct spots on its sides. The male is much larger than the female growing up to 15" he has longer more pointed fins and a large red spot behind his gills. The female is smaller growing up to 9-10" and a less dominant red spot. The male may also grow a nuchal hump when mature.

Distribution and habitat
The threespot cichlid is found in slow flowing stretches in the lower river valleys of the rivers of the Pacific Slope of Central America from Mexico to Panama, where there is a muddy or sandy substrate. Here it is found among the roots and weeds. It has been found as an introduced species in Florida and Nevada but these populations were extirpated, and in Singapore.

Biology
The three spot cichlid  feeds mainly on small fishes and invertebrates, including both aquatic and terrestrial insects. The pair usually select a flat stone and spawn on that, both parents guard the eggs fiercely and will also tend the fry after they have hatched.

In the aquarium
Trimacs cichlids are rarely found in the aquarium trade. It is thought that the three spot cichlid was used in the creation of the hybrid flowerhorn cichlid.

References

External links
"Trimac Cichlid AKA Three-Spot Cichlid", www.aquariacentral.com, accessed July 24, 2008

three spot cichlid
Cichlid fish of Central America
Fish of El Salvador
Fish of Honduras
Fish of Nicaragua
Taxa named by Albert Günther
Fish described in 1867